Ala Chaman (also Romanized as A‘lā Chaman and Ālā Chaman) is a village in Ijrud-e Bala Rural District, in the Central District of Ijrud County, Zanjan Province, Iran. At the 2006 census, its population was 1,048, in 233 families.

References 

Populated places in Ijrud County